Cicadellini is a tribe of leafhoppers in the family Cicadellidae. There are over 300 genera and several thousand described species in Cicadellini.

Selected Genera

 Agrosoma Medler, 1960
 Amblyscarta Stål, 1869
 Apogonalia Evans, 1947
 Bhandara Distant, 1908
 Bothrogonia Melichar, 1926
 Cicadella Latreille, 1817
 Ciminius Metcalf & Bruner, 1936
 Cofana Melichar, 1926
 Decua Oman, 1949
 Draeculacephala Ball, 1901
 Erythrogonia Melichar, 1926
 Graphocephala Van Duzee, 1916
 Helochara Fitch, 1851
 Hortensia Metcalf & Bruner, 1936
 Lissoscarta Stål, 1869
 Onega Distant, 1908
 Sibovia China, 1927
 Tylozygus Fieber, 1865
 Xyphon Hamilton, 1985

References

External links

 

 
Cicadellinae
Hemiptera tribes